Ghulam Shabber (born 12 December 1985) is a Pakistani-born cricketer who played for the United Arab Emirates national cricket team. He made his List A debut for the United Arab Emirates cricket team in their three-match series against Oman in October 2016. He retired from cricket in October 2019, mid-way through the 2019 ICC T20 World Cup Qualifier tournament, and in September 2021, he was handed a four-year ban from the sport in relation to corruption.

Career
Shabber made his Twenty20 International (T20I) debut for the United Arab Emirates against Afghanistan on 14 December 2016. He made his One Day International (ODI) debut for the United Arab Emirates against Scotland on 24 January 2017.

In January 2018, he was named in the United Arab Emirates's squad for the 2018 ICC World Cricket League Division Two tournament. In December 2018, he was named in the United Arab Emirates' team for the 2018 ACC Emerging Teams Asia Cup. In June 2019, he was selected to play for the Toronto Nationals franchise team in the 2019 Global T20 Canada tournament.

In September 2019, he was named in the United Arab Emirates' squad for the 2019 ICC T20 World Cup Qualifier tournament in the UAE. On 21 October 2019, Shabber did not show up for the pre-match meeting ahead of the fixture against Hong Kong. It later transpired that Shabber had left the country without an explanation, before being traced to Pakistan. On 26 October 2019, in an interview for The National, Shabber denied any involvement with corruption and announced his retirement from cricket, citing the poor remuneration for playing. He said that "if there is something with regards to anti-corruption, I am ready to cooperate in Pakistan. But I have decided cricket is not in my future". On 30 October 2019, the Emirates Cricket Board (ECB) confirmed that they had suspended Shabber for absconding, and that he was part of the International Cricket Councils (ICC) ongoing anti-corruption investigation. In September 2021, the ICC banned Shabber for four years for corruption.

References

External links
 

1985 births
Living people
Emirati cricketers
United Arab Emirates One Day International cricketers
United Arab Emirates Twenty20 International cricketers
Cricketers from Jhang
Pakistani emigrants to the United Arab Emirates
Pakistani expatriate sportspeople in the United Arab Emirates
Cricketers banned for corruption